Svein Valla (14 September 1948 – 13 September 2017) was a Norwegian molecular biologist.

He was a professor of microbial molecular biology at the Norwegian University of Science and Technology and fellow of the Norwegian Academy of Science and Letters.

References

1948 births
2017 deaths
Norwegian molecular biologists
Academic staff of the Norwegian University of Science and Technology
Members of the Norwegian Academy of Science and Letters